Fatima Jinnah (31 July 1893 – 9 July 1967), widely known as Māder-e Millat ("Mother of the Nation"), was a Pakistani stateswoman, politician, dental surgeon and one of the leading founders of Pakistan. She was the younger sister of Muhammad Ali Jinnah, the  founding father and the first Governor General of Pakistan. She was Leader of the Opposition of Pakistan from 1960 until her death in 1967.

After obtaining a dental degree from the University of Calcutta in 1923, then she became the first female dentist of undivided India; she also became a close associate and an adviser to her older brother, Muhammad Ali Jinnah, who later became the first Governor General of Pakistan. A strong critic of the British Raj, she emerged as a strong advocate of the two nation theory and a leading member of the All-India Muslim League.

After the independence of Pakistan, Jinnah co-founded the Pakistan Women's Association which played an integral role in the settlement of the women migrants in the newly formed country. She remained the closest confidant of her brother until his death. After his death, Fatima was banned from addressing the nation until 1951; her 1951 radio address to the nation was heavily censored by the Liaquat administration. She wrote the book My Brother, in 1955 but it was only published 32 years later, in 1987, due to censorship by the establishment, who had accused Fatima of "anti-nationalist material." Even when published several pages from the book's manuscript were left out.

Jinnah came out of her self-imposed political retirement in 1965 to participate in the presidential election against military dictator Ayub Khan. She was backed by a consortium of political parties, and despite political rigging by the military, won two of Pakistan's largest cities, Karachi and Dhaka. The U.S. magazine, Time, while reporting on the 1965 election campaign, wrote that Jinnah faced attacks on her modesty and patriotism by Ayub Khan and his allies.

Jinnah died in Karachi on 9 July 1967. Her death is subject to controversy, as some reports have alleged that she died of unnatural causes. Her family members had demanded an inquiry, however the government blocked their request. She remains one of the most honoured leaders in Pakistan, with nearly half a million people attending her funeral in Karachi.

Her legacy is associated with her support for civil rights, her struggle in the Pakistan Movement and her devotion to her brother. Referred to as Māder-e Millat ("Mother of the Nation") and Khātūn-e Pākistān ("Lady of Pakistan"), many institutions and public spaces in Pakistan have been named in her honour.

Early life and background
Fatima was born into the Jinnah family on 31 July 1893, the youngest of seven children to Jinnahbhai Poonja and his wife Mithibai, in Kathiawar, Gujarat, during the Bombay Presidency in British India. Jinnah's family history is disputed among various sources. Fatima had six siblings: Muhammad Ali, Ahmad Ali, Bunde Ali, Rahmat Ali, Maryam, and Shireen Jinnah. Of her siblings she was the closest to Muhammad Ali Jinnah who became her guardian upon the death of their father in 1901. She joined the Bandra Convent in Bombay in 1902. In 1919, she was admitted to the highly competitive University of Calcutta where she attended the Dr. R. Ahmed Dental College. After she graduated, she opened a dental clinic in Bombay in 1923.

Jinnah lived with her brother until 1918, when he married Rattanbai Petit. Upon Rattanbai's death in February 1929, she closed her clinic, moved into her brother Muhammad Ali Jinnah's bungalow to care for her niece Dina Jinnah and took charge of his house. This transition began the lifelong companionship that lasted until her brother's death on 11 September 1948.

Political life and the Presidential election of 1965

Jinnah accompanied her brother to every public appearance that he made. She travelled to London, England in 1930 where she learned to speak English. Jinnah lived there for 4 years. After she moved back to India, Jinnah sought to make an independent homeland for Indian Muslims.

During the transfer of power in 1947, Jinnah formed the Women's Relief Committee, which later formed the nucleus for the All Pakistan Women's Association (APWA) founded by Rana Liaquat Ali Khan. She also played a significant role in the settlement of Muhajirs in the new state of Pakistan.

Presidential election of 1965

In the 1960s, Jinnah returned to the forefront of political life when she ran for the presidency of Pakistan as a candidate for the Combined Opposition Party of Pakistan (COPP). She described her opponent, Ayub Khan, as a dictator. In her early rallies, nearly 250,000 people thronged to see her in Dhaka, and a million lined the 293-mile route from there to Chittagong. Her train, called the Freedom Special, was 22 hours late because men at each station pulled the emergency cord, and begged her to speak. The crowds hailed her as Madr-e-Millat, (Mother of the Nation).

In her speeches, she argued that by coming to terms with India on the Indus Water dispute, Ayub had surrendered control of the rivers to India. She narrowly lost the election, winning a majority in some provinces. The election did not involve direct democracy of the population, and some journalists and historians believe that if it had been a direct election she could have won.

Jinnah, popularly acclaimed as the Madr-e-Millat, or Mother of the Nation for her role in the Freedom Movement, contested the 1965 elections at the age of 71. Except for her brief tour to East Pakistan in 1954, she had not participated in politics since Independence. After the imposition of martial law by Ayub Khan, she once wished the regime well. Yet after martial law was lifted, she sympathized with the opposition as she was strongly in favor of democratic ideals. Being sister of her beloved brother, she was held in high esteem, and came to symbolize the democratic aspirations of the people. The electoral landscape changed when Jinnah decided to contest the elections for the president's office in 1965. She was challenging the dictator and self-proclaimed "president" Ayub Khan in the indirect election, which Ayub Khan had himself instituted.

Presidential candidates for the vote of 1965 were announced before commencement of the Basic Democracy elections, which was to constitute the Electoral College for the Presidential and Assembly elections. There were two major parties contesting the election, the Convention Muslim League and the Combined Opposition Parties. The Combined Opposition Parties consisted of five major opposition parties. It had a nine-point program, which included restoration of direct elections, adult franchise and democratization of the 1962 Constitution. The opposition parties of Combined Opposition Parties were not united and did not possess any unity of thought and action. They were unable to select presidential candidates from amongst themselves; therefore they selected Jinnah as their candidate.

Elections were held on 2 January 1965. There were four candidates: Ayub Khan, Fatima Jinnah and two obscure persons with no party affiliation. There was a short campaigning period of one month, which was further restricted to nine projection meetings that were organized by the Election Commission and were attended only by the members of the Electoral College and members of the press. The public was barred from attending the projection meetings, which would have enhanced Jinnah's image.

Ayub Khan had a great advantage over the rest of the candidates. The Second Amendment to the Constitution confirmed him as president till the election of his successor. Armed with the wide-ranging constitutional powers of a President, he exercised complete control over all governmental machinery during elections. He utilized the state facilities as head of state, not as the President of the Convention Muslim League or a presidential candidate, and did not hesitate to legislate on electoral matters. Bureaucracy and business, the two beneficiaries of the Ayub Khan regime, helped him in his election campaign. Taking advantage of political opportunities, he brought all the discontented elements together to support him; students were assured the revision of the University Ordinance and journalists the scrutiny of the Press Laws. Ayub Khan also gathered the support of the Ulama who were of the view that Islam does not permit a woman to be the head of an Islamic state.

Jinnah had detached herself from the political conflicts that had plagued Pakistan after the founder's death. The sight of her moving through the streets of big cities, and even in the rural areas of a Muslim country, added to her popularity. She proclaimed Ayub Khan to be a dictator. Jinnah's line of attack was that by coming to terms with the Republic of India on the Indus Water dispute, Ayub had surrendered control of the rivers over to India. Her campaign generated tremendous public enthusiasm. She drew enormous crowds in all cities of East and West Pakistan. The campaign however suffered from a number of drawbacks. An unfair and unequal election campaign, poor finances, and indirect elections through the Basic Democracy System were some of the basic problems she faced.

Jinnah won the popular vote in the presidential election of 1965. However through post election rigging, coercion and manipulation of the electoral college, Ayub Khan got himself elected as the President of Pakistan. It is believed that had the elections been held via direct ballot, she would have won. The Electoral College consisted of only 80,000 Basic Democrats, who were easily manipulated. The importance of this election lay in the fact that a woman was contesting the highest political office of the country. The orthodox religious political parties, including the Jamaat-e-Islami led by Maulana Maududi, which had repeatedly declared that a woman could not hold the highest office of a Muslim country, modified their stance and supported the candidature of Jinnah. The election showed that the people had no prejudice against women holding high offices, and they could be key players in politics of the country.

During a lawsuit, Matloobul Hassan Syed deposed that during Jinnah's election campaign against General Ayub Khan, when some local Shia leaders told her that they would vote for Ayub, she contended that she could represent them better as she was a Shia. According to Liaquat H. Merchant, "the Court was inclined to repose more trust in the avowed non-sectarian public stance of the Quaid and his sister". Both Muhammad Ali Jinnah and his sister "carefully avoided a sectarian label."

Biography of Muhammad Ali Jinnah

Jinnah's unfinished biography of Muhammad Ali Jinnah, My Brother, was published by the Quaid-i-Azam Academy in 1987.

Death

Fatima Jinnah died in Karachi on 9 July 1967. The official cause of death was heart failure, but rumours persist that she was murdered at her house by the same group who killed Liaquat Ali Khan. In 2003, her nephew, Akbar Pirbhai, reignited the controversy by suggesting that she was assassinated.  When Fatima Jinnah died in 1967, her private last rites were performed according to Shia guidelines and the state-sponsored namaz-e-janaza (Sunni burial) followed it. She is buried next to her brother, Muhammad Ali Jinnah, at Mazar-e-Quaid, Karachi.

Honours and legacy

Jinnah remained extremely popular and is considered one of the greatest female figures Pakistan has produced. Jinnah is a source of the awakening of women's rights. In Pakistan, she rose to stand as Pakistan's national symbol, and unlike Ayub Khan who died in poor health and yet no honours were given him, Jinnah received tremendous honours from the society after her death.

Family and childhood

Family photos

Selected eponymous entities
 Fatima Jinnah Colony
 Fatima Jinnah Dental College
 Fatima Jinnah Medical University
 Fatima Jinnah Park
 Fatima Jinnah Women University

See also 
 Jinnah family
 Pakistan movement
 List of Pakistan Movement activists

References

Further reading
 

 
1893 births
1967 deaths
Fatima
Leaders of the Opposition (Pakistan)
Leaders of the Pakistan Movement
National symbols of Pakistan
Pakistani biographers
Pakistani dentists
Pakistani political candidates
Candidates for President of Pakistan
Presidents of Pakistan
Vice presidents of Pakistan
Khoja Ismailism
Pakistani Ismailis
University of Calcutta alumni
Women dentists
Pakistani people of Gujarati descent
Politicians from Karachi
Pakistani women medical doctors
Women members of the National Assembly of Pakistan
Members of the Pakistan Philosophical Congress
Women opposition leaders
Pakistani MNAs 1962–1965
Pakistani MNAs 1965–1969
20th-century dentists
20th-century Pakistani women politicians